TOSC may refer to:
 Total oxidant scavenging capacity, a quantification of the absorbance capacity of antioxidants toward potent oxidants
 Tournament of State Champions

Tosc may refer :
 Tosc (peak), a peak in the Julian Alps